"White Trash Millionaire" is a song by American hard rock band Black Stone Cherry. It is the first single from their third studio album Between the Devil and the Deep Blue Sea. It was released onto digital media outlets on April 1, 2011.

Music video

The music video was shot in a scrap yard and was done in the style of a low budget commercial featuring Chris Robertson driving a 1977 Pontiac Trans Am, Ben Wells Driving a 1961 Chevrolet Impala, Jon Lawhon driving a 1969 Pontiac Firebird, and John Fred Young driving a 1970 Dodge Challenger and was produced and directed by David Sutton for Frantic Studio.

Charts

References

Black Stone Cherry songs
2011 songs
2011 singles
Roadrunner Records singles
Songs written by Zac Maloy
Song recordings produced by Howard Benson